Lefkada (Leucadius) was a bishop of Bayeux from the first half of the 6th century.

He is the first bishop of Bayeux whose presence is attested. In 538 he attended the Third Council of Orléans. He sent the priest Theodorus as a representative to the Fourth Council of Orléans in 541 and again to the Fifth Council of Orléans of October 549.

References

Date of birth unknown
Date of death unknown
Bishops of Bayeux
6th-century bishops in Gaul
6th-century Christian clergy